The Serb Volunteer Guard ( / Srpska dobrovoljačka garda, SDG), also known as Arkan's Tigers (or only Tigers;  / arkanovi tigrovi, or only Тигрови / Tigrovi) or Arkan's men ( / Arkanovci), was a Serbian volunteer paramilitary unit founded and led by Arkan that fought in Croatia (1991–93) and Bosnia (1992–95) during the Yugoslav Wars and was responsible for numerous war crimes and massacres.

History and organization

The Guard was created on 11 October 1990 by twenty members of the Red Star Belgrade football club Ultra group Delije Sever. The Guard was under the command of the Territorial Defense, a regular military in charge of the territories of Croatia populated predominantly by Serbs during the first half of the 1990s. Serb Volunteer Guard was organized as a gang of criminals and armed by Belgrade.

The Serb Volunteer Guard set up their headquarters and training camp in a former military facility in Erdut. It saw action from mid-1991 to late 1995, initially in the Vukovar region of Croatia. It was supplied and equipped from the reserves of the Serbian police force during the War in Croatia and Bosnia.

War in Croatia (1991) & Bosnia-Herzegovina (1992)
After war broke out in the former Yugoslav republic of Croatia in the fall of 1991 and in Bosnia in April 1992, Arkan and his units moved to attack different territories in these countries. In Croatia, the Tigers fought in various locales in Eastern Slavonia.

Serb Volunteer Guard under Arkan command massacred hundreds of people in eastern Croatia and Bosnia and Herzegovina while in the early
ethnic cleansing campaigns in eastern Bosnia this unit had a major role.
In autumn 1995, Arkan's troops fought in the area of Banja Luka, Sanski Most and Prijedor where they were routed. Arkan personally led most war actions, and rewarded his most efficient officers and soldiers with ranks, medals and eventually the products of lootings. The Serb Volunteer Guard was officially disbanded in April 1996. Besides Arkan, a notable member of the Guard was his right-hand man, Colonel Nebojša Djordjević, who was murdered in late 1996. Another notable member was Milorad Ulemek, who is now serving a 40-year sentence for his involvement in the assassination of Serbia's pro-Western prime minister Zoran Đinđić in 2003.

War crimes charges

Željko Ražnatović was indicted in 1997 by the International Criminal Tribunal for the Former Yugoslavia for his command of the Guard, as the unit was allegedly responsible for numerous crimes against humanity, grave breaches of the Geneva Convention and violations of the laws or customs of war, including active participation in the ethnic cleansing in Bijeljina and Zvornik in 1992.

The ICTY charged the Serb Volunteer Guard, under the command or supervision of Željko Ražnatović with:
Transporting twelve non-Serb men from Sanski Most to an isolated location in the village of Trnova, where they shot and killed eleven of the men and critically wounded the twelfth.
The rape of a Muslim woman on a bus outside the Hotel Sanus in Sanski Most.
Transporting approximately sixty-seven non-Serb men and one woman from Sanski Most, Šehovci, and Pobrijeze to an isolated location in the village of Sasina and shooting them, killing sixty-five of the captives and wounding two survivors.
Forcibly detaining approximately thirty-five non-Serb men in an inadequately ventilated boiler room of about five square metres in size, beating them, and depriving them of food and water, resulting in the deaths of two men.

Prominent members
Željko "Arkan" Ražnatović – SDG Commander
Borislav Pelević – Serbian presidential candidate in 2002 and 2004
Milorad "Legija" Ulemek – JSO Commander
Zvezdan "Zmija" Jovanović
Mihajlo Ulemek  – SDG Colonel
Srđan Golubović - a trance DJ (not to be mistaken with a film director of the same name)
Many of the former members of "Arkan Tigers" are prominent figures in Serbia, maintaining close ties between each other and with Russian nationalist organisations. Jugoslav Simić and Svetozar Pejović posed with Russian Night Wolves, Ceca (Arkan's widow) performed for Vladimir Putin during his visit in Serbia, Srđan Golubović is a popular trance performer known as "DJ Max" and was identified by Rolling Stone as the SDG soldier kicking dead bodies of a Bosniak family in Bijeljina on a photo from 1992.

In popular culture
 in the 2001 film Behind Enemy Lines (loosely based on the story of pilot Scott O'Grady during the Bosnian War), the unit appears as the main antagonists, led by the fictional Miroslav Lokar.
 In the 2008 Serbian film The Tour, a group of Serbian actors go on a tour in war-torn Bosnia. Among other factions, they meet an unnamed paramilitary unit wearing insignia similar to those of the Serb Volunteer Guard. The unit's commander (played by Sergej Trifunović) is clearly based on Arkan.
 In the 2012 Japanese anime Jormungand, one of the antagonists is Dragan Nikolaevich, commander of the Balkan Dragons. His looks and even his biography bear resounding resemblance to those of Arkan.
 Twice Born (2012) film is based on a novel by Margaret Mazzantini set in the background of Bosnian War.
 In fourteenth episode of the first season of the crime procedural Law & Order: Criminal Intent, "Homo Homini Lupis", the suspect of the investigation is accused of raping a young girl. In the course of the detectives' interrogation, they identify the suspect as a former member of the volunteer guard due to a tiger tattoo on his back and attempt to establish a pattern of behavior by pointing to the war crimes that occurred in Bosnia.

See also
 Serbia in the Yugoslav Wars
 List of Serbian paramilitary formations

References

Books

External links

ICTY indictment against Arkan

Paramilitary organizations in the Yugoslav Wars
Paramilitary organizations based in Serbia
Military units and formations of the Bosnian War
Military units and formations of the Croatian War of Independence
National liberation movements
Serbian war crimes in the Croatian War of Independence
Serbian war crimes in the Bosnian War
Serbian nationalism in Bosnia and Herzegovina
1990 establishments in Serbia
1990 establishments in Croatia
Defunct paramilitary organizations